General elections were held in the Marshall Islands on 21 November 2011. The general election is held every four years.

An estimated 36,000 Marshallese voted in the election. Final results were not known until after 5 December 2011, when overseas ballots were due.

Unofficial results indicated the incumbent president was likely to have the same one-vote majority in parliament he had before the election.

Health minister Amenta Matthew and former foreign minister Gerald Zackios lost reelection due to postal ballots.

A tie in the race for the Ujae Atoll seat was only broken after a recount.

References

Elections in the Marshall Islands
Marshall
General election
Legislature of the Marshall Islands
Non-partisan elections
Election and referendum articles with incomplete results